The 1904 Summer Olympics (officially the Games of the III Olympiad and also known as St. Louis 1904) were an international multi-sport event held in St. Louis, Missouri, United States, from 29 August to 3 September 1904, as part of an extended sports program lasting from 1 July to 23 November 1904, located at what is now known as Francis Field on the campus of Washington University in St. Louis. This was the first time that the Olympic Games were held outside Europe.

Tensions caused by the Russo–Japanese War and difficulties in traveling to St. Louis resulted in very few top-class athletes from outside the United States and Canada taking part in the 1904 Games. Only 62 of the 651 athletes who competed came from outside North America, and only between 12 and 15 nations were represented in all. Some events subsequently combined the U.S. national championship with the Olympic championship. The current three-medal format of gold, silver and bronze for first, second and third place was introduced at the 1904 Olympics.

Background
Chicago, Illinois, won the bid to host the 1904 Summer Olympics, but the organizers of the Louisiana Purchase Exposition in St. Louis would not accept another international event in the same timeframe.

The exposition organization began to plan for its own sports activities, informing the Chicago OCOG that its own international sports events intended to eclipse the Olympic Games unless they were moved to St. Louis. Pierre de Coubertin, the founder of the modern Olympic movement, stepped in and awarded the Games to St. Louis.

The Games

Highlights

Boxing, dumbbells, freestyle wrestling and the decathlon made their debuts. The swimming events were held in a temporary pond near Skinker and Wydown Boulevards, where "lifesaving demonstrations" of unsinkable lifeboats for ocean liners took place.

One of the most remarkable athletes was the American gymnast George Eyser, who won six medals even though his left leg was made of wood, and Frank Kugler won four medals in freestyle wrestling, weightlifting and tug of war, making him the only competitor to win a medal in three different sports at the same Olympic Games.

Chicago runner James Lightbody won the steeplechase and the 800 m and then set a world record in the 1500 m. Harry Hillman won both the 200 m and 400 m hurdles and also the flat 400 m. Sprinter Archie Hahn was champion in the 60 m, 100 m and 200 m. In this last race, he set an Olympic record in 21.6, a record that stood for 28 years. In the discus, after American Martin Sheridan had thrown exactly the same distance as his compatriot, Ralph Rose (39.28 m), the judges gave them both an extra throw to decide the winner. Sheridan won the decider and claimed the gold medal. Ray Ewry again won all three standing jumps.

The team representing Great Britain was awarded a total of two medals, both won by Irish athletes. The top non-U.S. athlete was Emil Rausch of Germany, who won three swimming events. Zoltán Halmay of Hungary and Charles Daniels of the United States each won two swimming gold medals. Galt Football Club from Canada won the gold medal in football.

Anthropology Days

The organizers of the World's Fair held "Anthropology Days" on August 12 and 13. Since the 1889 Paris Exposition, human zoos, as a key feature of world's fairs, functioned as demonstrations of anthropological notions of race, progress, and civilization. These goals were followed also at the 1904 World's Fair. Fourteen hundred indigenous people from Southeast Asia, the Pacific Islands, East Asia, Africa, the Middle East, South America and North America were displayed in anthropological exhibits that showed them in their natural habitats. Another 1600 indigenous people displayed their culture in other areas of the Louisiana Purchase Exposition (LPE), including on the fairgrounds and at the Model School, where American Indian boarding schools students demonstrated their successful assimilation. The sporting event itself took place with the participation of about 100 paid indigenous men (no women participated in Anthropology Days, though some, notably the Fort Shaw Indian School girls basketball team, did compete in other athletic events at the LPE). Contests included "baseball throwing, shot put, running, broad jumping, weight lifting, pole climbing, and tugs-of-war before a crowd of approximately ten thousand". According to theorist Susan Brownell, world's fairs – with their inclusion of human zoos – and the Olympics were a logical fit at this time, as they "were both linked to an underlying cultural logic that gave them a natural affinity". Also, one of the original intentions of Anthropology Days was to create publicity for the official Olympic events.

Sports
The 1904 Summer Olympic program featured 16 sports encompassing 95 events in 18 disciplines. Swimming, diving and water polo are considered three disciplines of the same sport, aquatics. In July 2021 the IOC accepted the recommendation of Olympic historian Bill Mallon regarding which sports and events should be considered as Olympic. The number of events in each discipline is noted in parentheses.

New sports

Boxing made its Olympic debut at the St. Louis Games. The sport has since featured at every Summer Olympics, except for the 1912 Stockholm Games. 

While wrestling made a return, it was exclusively the newly-debuted freestyle wrestling as opposed to Greco-Roman style of the 1896 Summer Olympics. Later editions would have both styles of wrestling in their programs.

Demonstration sports
Basketball, hurling, American football and baseball were featured as demonstration sports. Gaelic football was also an unofficial demonstration sport at the 1904 Olympics. There was a demonstration bout of women's boxing.

Water polo is also mentioned in the games reports for the 1904 Summer Olympics. At the time it was not considered to be a demonstration sport, but, as of 2020, the IOC does not include it in its records.

Venues

Five sports venues were used for the 1904 Summer Olympics. The venues included Glen Echo Country Club, the first golf course constructed west of the Mississippi River, which had opened in 1901. Three Olympic sports were hosted at Forest Park, the site of the Louisiana Purchase Exposition which was being held concurrently with the Olympics: the Life Saving Exhibition Lake at Forest Park was used for the diving, swimming, and water polo events.

Creve Coeur Lake became the first park of St. Louis County in 1945. The Lake has hosted rowing regattas since 1882 and still hosts them as of 2010. Francis Olympic Field and Gymnasium are still in use on the Washington University in St. Louis campus as of 2021. An ornamental gate commemorating the 1904 Games was constructed outside the stadium immediately after the Exposition. A swimming pool was added to the gymnasium in 1985. Forest Park, constructed in 1876, is still in use as of 2021 and attracts over 12 million visitors annually. Glen Echo Country Club remains in use as a golf course today as of 2021.

Participating nations

Athletes from twelve nations competed in St. Louis. Numbers in parentheses indicate the number of known competitors for each nation. Due to the difficulty of getting to St. Louis in 1904, and European tensions caused by the Russo-Japanese War, only 62 athletes from outside North America participated in the Olympics.

Disputed
Some sources also list athletes from the following nations as having competed at these Games.
 
 
  Newfoundland Colony (1)

Number of athletes by National Olympic Committees

Medal count

These are the nations that won medals at the 1904 Games.

Notes on medalists
The nationalities of some medalists were disputed, as many American athletes were recent immigrants to the United States who had not yet been granted U.S. citizenship. In July 2021, the IOC accepted the recommendation of Olympic historian Bill Mallon and adjusted data in their database on the following cases.

In 2009, historians from the International Society of Olympic Historians discovered that cyclist Frank Bizzoni, believed to be an American, was still an Italian citizen when he competed in 1904: he was granted U.S. citizenship in 1917.

Two Norwegian-American wrestlers, Charles Ericksen and Bernhoff Hansen won gold medals. In 2012, Norwegian historians found documentation showing that Ericksen did not receive American citizenship until March 22, 1905, and that Hansen probably never received American citizenship. The historians have therefore petitioned the IOC to have the athletes registered as Norwegians. In May 2013, it was reported that the Norwegian Olympic Committee had filed a formal application for changing the nationality of the wrestlers in the IOC's medal database.

Francis Gailey competed in 1904 as an Australian. He immigrated to America in 1906, sailing to San Francisco in the SS Sonoma, and worked as a banker in California, living for a time in Ontario, Canada, where he married Mary Adams, and finally settled in 1918 in southern California, managing orange-grove plantations.

Multi-medalist Frank Kugler of Germany, a member of the St. Louis Southwest Turnverein team, was granted U.S. citizenship in 1913.

Gustav Tiefenthaler was born in Switzerland, but the family moved to the United States when he was young. He represented the South Broadway AC in St. Louis. At the Olympics, Tiefenthaler wrestled one bout and lost, but earned a bronze medal.

French-American Albert Corey won silver medal in marathon, and silver medal in team race as part of a mixed team (together with four undisputed Americans).

Austrian-American gymnast Julius Lenhart won gold and silver medals in individual events and gold medal in team competition as a part of the mixed team.

The IOC counted one gold, one silver, and two bronze medals won by the American fencer Albertson Van Zo Post for Cuba instead of the United States: the IOC also shows Charles Tatham as Cuban for individual fencing events and American for the team event, but he was an American.

See also

References

External links

The Olympic Games 1904, Charles J.P. Lucas
Spalding's Athletic Almanac for 1905
Photos of the 1904 Olympics from the Missouri History Museum

 
Olympic Games in the United States
Summer Olympics by year
Sports competitions in St. Louis
Louisiana Purchase Exposition
Summer Olympics
Summer Olympics
Summer Olympics, 1904
Summer Olympics
1900s in St. Louis
Olympic Games in Missouri
Sports competitions in Missouri
1904 in sports in Missouri
Washington University in St. Louis